Martin Kitel (born 24 April 1966) is a Swedish boxer. He competed in the men's light middleweight event at the 1988 Summer Olympics.

References

External links
 

1966 births
Living people
Swedish male boxers
Olympic boxers of Sweden
Boxers at the 1988 Summer Olympics
People from Landskrona Municipality
Light-middleweight boxers
Sportspeople from Skåne County
20th-century Swedish people